Booker T. Washington School is a historic school building located at Rushville, Rush County, Indiana.  It was built in 1905, and is a two-story, "T"-plan, vernacular brick building with Romanesque Revival style design elements. It has a low-pitched hipped roof and features round and segmental arched openings.  The building served as the focal point for the African-American community of Rushville.It is currently being used as a neighborhood community center and is home of the local Head Start program.

It was listed on the National Register of Historic Places in 1990.

See also
 List of things named after Booker T. Washington

References

African-American history of Indiana
School buildings on the National Register of Historic Places in Indiana
Romanesque Revival architecture in Indiana
School buildings completed in 1905
Buildings and structures in Rush County, Indiana
National Register of Historic Places in Rush County, Indiana
1905 establishments in Indiana